Mastigoteuthis dentata is a species of whip-lash squid.

References

External links

Tree of Life web project: Mastigoteuthis dentata

Mastigoteuthis
Molluscs described in 1904
Taxa named by William Evans Hoyle